The Jereh Group is a Chinese oil field services company and manufacturer of oilfield equipment.

History
The company was founded in 1999 and listed on the Shenzhen Stock Exchange in 2010. Its market capitalization reached around $7 billion in 2015.

Markets
Jereh is one of the largest domestic oilfield equipment and service providers. It has a domestic market share of about half for shale drilling equipment.

It is also one of the leading foreign suppliers of oilfield equipment to Russia, where it has gained market share since 2014 when Western sanctions were applied against Russia, targeting specifically the oil and gas industry.

References

Manufacturing companies of China
Companies based in Shandong
Chinese companies established in 1999
Companies listed on the Shenzhen Stock Exchange